Christa Köhler (later Kinast, born 18 August 1951) is a retired East German diver who specialized in the 3 m springboard event. She won a silver medal at the 1976 Montreal Olympics, placing 11th in 1972, and a gold medal at the 1977 European Championships.

References

1951 births
Living people
Olympic divers of East Germany
Divers at the 1972 Summer Olympics
Divers at the 1976 Summer Olympics
German female divers
Olympic silver medalists for East Germany
Olympic medalists in diving
Medalists at the 1976 Summer Olympics
World Aquatics Championships medalists in diving